Samuel Oke
is an Anglican bishop in Nigeria: he was the pioneer Bishop of Ekiti West from 2005  until his retirement in 2018.

Notes

Living people
Anglican bishops of Ekiti West
21st-century Anglican bishops in Nigeria
Year of birth missing (living people)